RuPaul's Drag Race: Vegas Revue is a six-episode documentary series about RuPaul's Drag Race Live!, that premiered on VH1 on August 21, 2020. The premiere episode was dedicated to the memory of Chi Chi DeVayne, a former RuPaul's Drag Race and RuPaul's Drag Race All Stars contestant who died in August 2020.

Cast

Main
 Vanessa Vanjie Mateo
 Kameron Michaels
 Yvie Oddly
 Asia O'Hara
 Derrick Barry
 Naomi Smalls

Episodes

Ratings

References

2020 American television series debuts
2020s American reality television series
American television spin-offs
RuPaul's Drag Race
Television shows set in Las Vegas
Television series by World of Wonder (company)
VH1 original programming